The Cobb salad is a main-dish American garden salad typically made with chopped salad greens (iceberg lettuce, watercress, endives and romaine lettuce), tomato, crisp bacon, chicken breast, hard-boiled eggs, avocado, chives, blue cheese, and red-wine vinaigrette. The ingredients are laid out on a plate in neat rows.

Origin
Various stories recount how the salad was invented. One says that it came about in 1938 at the Hollywood Brown Derby restaurant, where it became a signature dish. It is named after the restaurant's owner, Robert Howard Cobb. Stories vary whether the salad was invented by Cobb or by his chef, Paul J. Posti. The legend is that Cobb had not eaten until near midnight, and so he mixed together leftovers he found in the kitchen, along with some bacon cooked by the line cook, and tossed it with their French dressing.

Another version of the creation is that Robert Kreis, executive chef at the restaurant, created the salad in 1929 (the year the Brown Derby's Hollywood location opened) and named it in honor of Robert Cobb. The same source confirms that 1937 was the reported date of the version noted above, with Cobb making the salad.

Another version of events is that the salad was hastily arranged from leftovers by owner Bob Cobb for showman and theater owner Sid Grauman. It was chopped fine, because Grauman had just had dental work done, and couldn't chew well.

Authentic versions of the Cobb salad are prepared using four varieties of greens: iceberg lettuce, watercress, endive and romaine lettuce.

Some recipes include other types of cheese besides Roquefort, such as cheddar or Monterey Jack, or no cheese at all.

See also 
 List of foods named after people
 List of salads
 
 Cuisine of California
Chef salad

References

American poultry dishes
American salads
Bacon dishes